Robert Barnwell Allison House is a historic home located at Lancaster, Lancaster County, South Carolina. It was built in 1897, and is a rectangular, two-story, frame clapboard covered Queen Anne style dwelling. It has a tall, hipped roof with intersecting gables and diamond novelty shingle covered gable ends.

It was added to the National Register of Historic Places in 1990.

References

Houses on the National Register of Historic Places in South Carolina
Queen Anne architecture in South Carolina
Houses completed in 1897
Houses in Lancaster County, South Carolina
National Register of Historic Places in Lancaster County, South Carolina